Derby High School is a public secondary education school for grades 9–12, it is located at 75 Chatfield Street in Derby. It is the only public secondary education school in Derby and is one of five public schools in the city.

The current school building was built in 1967, and up until 2010 housed Derby Middle and High Schools together. In 2010, Derby Middle School was completed across the street from the high school.

History

Greg Gaillard serves as principal until 2014, when he resigned.

Former Buildings

Athletics

References

External links

Schools in New Haven County, Connecticut
Educational institutions established in 1909
1909 establishments in Connecticut